In Greek Mythology, Leimakids were nymphs of meadows. They are also known as Leimoniads.

References

Nymphs